Forest Park High School is a public secondary school in the Dorchester neighborhood of Baltimore, Maryland, United States. Forest Park was established in 1924 as the Forest Park Junior-Senior High School. In 1932, the Forest Park Junior High School was moved and renamed the Garrison Junior High School. 

The Old Senior High School remained at its 4300 Chatham Road location until 1981 when it was torn down and the new school was built and occupied at the current Eldorado location.

Notable faculty
Wendell E. Dunn, principal 1935–1961

Notable alumni
Spiro T. Agnew, 39th Vice President of the United States
Thomas Beck, film actor
H Steven Blum, retired United States Army Lieutenant General who served as Chief of the National Guard Bureau
William Ellinghaus, businessman
Cass Elliot, American singer Mama Cass of The Mamas & the Papas
Billy Griffin, lead singer of The Miracles, solo artist
Margaret Hayes, film and television actress
Barbara A. Hoffman, (D), Maryland State Senator, District 42, Baltimore City (1983–2003) 
Earl Hofmann, Baltimore Realist artist, graduated 1946
Barry Levinson, movie director
Robert C. Murphy, chief judge, Maryland Court of Appeals
Alan Sagner, New Jersey Commissioner of Transportation
Howard "Chip" Silverman, author lacrosse coach
Mark Rosenker, Former Chairman, National Transportation Safety Board (NTSB) and Major General, USAF (ret)
Mary Tabor, American author of literary fiction
Celeste Ulrich (1924-2011) (class of 1942), leading educator in physical education
Arnold M. Weiner, noted attorney

Notes

External links

Forest Park, Baltimore
Public high schools in Maryland
Public schools in Baltimore